Enterococcus haemoperoxidus is a species of Enterococcus with type strain CCM 4851T (= LMG 19487T).

References

Further reading

External links

LPSN
Type strain of Enterococcus haemoperoxidus at BacDive -  the Bacterial Diversity Metadatabase

haemoperoxidus
Bacteria described in 2001